Cascina is a comune in the Province of Pisa, Italy

Cascina may also refer to:

 Cascina a corte, a type of rural building traditional of the Po Valley, Italy
 A.S.D. Cascina, an Italian association football club located in Cascina, Italy

See also 

 Cascine (disambiguation)